Elijah Anderson (born 1 March 1999) is a professional rugby league footballer who plays as a er for the Canberra Raiders in the NRL.

Playing career
In round 21 of the 2021 NRL season, Anderson made his first grade debut for Canberra against the St. George Illawarra Dragons.

References

External links
Canberra Raiders profile

1999 births
Living people
Australian rugby league players
Canberra Raiders players
Rugby league wingers